The Robert E. Campbell House is a historic house located in Springfield, Oregon. The architectural style reflects Rural Gothic style and it was built by early pioneer Robert E. Campbell about 1873. It was listed on the National Register of Historic Places on November 1, 1979.

Setting
In 1979 the historic building sits on a remaining  parcel of Campbell's Donation Land Claim of 1852. This parcel constitutes a rectangular  by  lot bounded on the east by Aspen Avenue. The structure remains in good condition and largely intact in form and detail. Located outside the city limits in a rural suburban neighborhood the home has about  clearance on all sides. The front yard has trees from close to the time the house was built and a garden featuring 26 varieties of rhododendron. There is a large garden in the rear also.

Robert E. Campbell
Robert E. Campbell was born September 4, 1830, in Lafayette County, Missouri and married Ruth Campbell there in 1849. With a team oxen and two cows the Campbells and a cousin traveled to Lane County, Oregon from April to October 1851. In addition to the substantial agriculture and animal husbandry activities on his  1852 Donation Land Claim, he engaged in mining in Jackson County in 1854 and shipping. With his cousin he constructed a flatboat and transported  of flour to Portland in 1859 for which they received  a barrel. He built the home now known as the Robert E. Campbell House between 1870 and 1873 and removed there in 1876.

See also
 Homestead Acts
 Historic preservation
 National Register of Historic Places listings in Lane County, Oregon

References

External links
 
 

1870 establishments in Oregon
Houses completed in 1870
Houses in Lane County, Oregon
Houses on the National Register of Historic Places in Oregon
National Register of Historic Places in Lane County, Oregon
Springfield, Oregon